K. Aslıhan Yener, often anglicised as K. Aslihan Yener, is a Turkish American  archaeologist whose work on Bronze Age tin mines in Anatolia revealed a new possible source of the important metal.

Education and career
Yener was born in Istanbul to Turkish parents, and moved to the United States, in New Rochelle, New York at the age of six months. In 1964, she entered Adelphi University in Garden City, New York planning to study chemistry. Soon she visited her native Turkey and subsequently transferred to Robert College in Istanbul in 1966, where she studied the humanities.  While studying a course in Roman ruins in Turkey, she noticed and became interested in the earlier prehistoric periods at those sites. After graduating from Robert College in 1969 she continued graduate school and majored in archaeology. She received her PhD from Columbia University in New York in 1980, and was an associate professor of history at Boğaziçi University from 1980 to 1988. Aslıhan Yener became a Professor of Anatolian Archaeology in the Archaeology and History of Art Dept. at Koç University and an associate professor of Near Eastern Languages and Civilizations Department at the University of Chicago, Oriental Institute.

She is currently an emeritus associate professor at the University of Chicago.

Book
Yener is the author of the book The domestication of metals: the rise of complex metal industries in Anatolia (Brill, 2000).

See also
Bronze Age
Tin sources and trade in ancient times
Göltepe

References

External links
 The Göltepe/Kestel Project
 Tin Smelting at the Oriental Institute
 Swords, Armor, and Figurines: A Metalliferous View from the Central Taurus
 Faculty Page at University of Chicago

20th-century American archaeologists
American women archaeologists
Living people
Scientists from New York (state)
Archaeologists of the Bronze Age Aegean
Columbia University alumni
University of Chicago faculty
Adelphi University alumni
Alumni of Arnavutköy American High School for Girls
Turkish emigrants to the United States
Turkish archaeologists
Turkish women archaeologists
Turkish women academics
Academic staff of Boğaziçi University
People from New Rochelle, New York
Year of birth missing (living people)
American academics of Turkish descent
21st-century American archaeologists
20th-century American women
American women academics
21st-century American women
Historians from New York (state)